Tunçboyacıyan is a surname. Notable people with the surname include:

 Arto Tunçboyacıyan  (Armenian: Արտո Թունչբոյաջյան) (born 1957), Armenian musician
  Ohannes Tunçboyacı (Onno Tunç) (Armenian: Օհաննես Թունչբոյաջյան) (born 1948), Turkish musician

Armenian-language surnames